"For the Love of You" (sometimes titled "For the Love of You (Part 1 & 2)") is a song recorded by the Isley Brothers, who released the song as the second single off their 1975 album, The Heat Is On. The record showcased the two sides of the act, with the album's first single "Fight the Power" reflecting a fast-paced funk vibe while showcasing a ballad side on the latter. The song later became a crossover hit for the brothers.

Release
"For the Love of You" was released in September 1975, after the success of its predecessor, "Fight the Power", had started to dwindle, leading to a drop of the charts. "For the Love of You" nearly repeated the success of its predecessor, reaching #22 on the Billboard Hot 100, giving the brothers the rarity of having two top 40 singles off one album as opposed to one every album, marking it as the first time that had happened since the 1972 album, Brother, Brother, Brother, where two top 40 singles emerged from that album ("Work to Do" and "Pop That Thang"). The song peaked at #10 on Billboard's R&B chart.

The song's success was contributed to the album's sequencing in which the harder, funk and rock-oriented first three tracks were placed on side one, while the more melodic, sensual soul ballads were placed on side two. As a result of the success of "For the Love of You", R&B radio began playing the album's other two ballads regularly – "Sensuality" and the album's swan song, "Make Me Say It Again, Girl". Since then, all three of the songs from the album's second side continued to get play on quiet storm radio playlists.

Cover versions and samples

Covers
In 1987, Whitney Houston covered the song on her second studio album, Whitney. The song features as the B-side on the third single "So Emotional", released on November 12, 1987. Her cover version earned a nomination for Best Female R&B Vocal Performance at the 1988 Grammy Awards. 

In 1999, Regine Velasquez did a covered of this song together with KC Montero and Gabby Eigenmann from her 1999 album, R2K.

In 2004, Regina Belle (with background vocal group the Perry Sisters) covered the song in a medley with “The Love I Lost” by Harold Melvin & the Blue Notes for her album, Lazy Afternoon.

Samples
"For the Love of You" was sampled by Masta Ace in his song entitled "The I.N.C. Ride",
3 E Oeil sampled the song for their song “Laise Toi Aller".
504 Boyz sampled the song on "I Gotta Have That There" off their 2002 album Ballers.
Murs sampled the song in "Me and This Jawn" off of his Murs for President album in 2008.
Poison Clan sampled the song in “Ho Stories” of their “Poisonous Mentality” album in 1992.

Credits
Credits are adapted from the album's liner notes
Ronald Isley: lead vocals
O'Kelly Isley, Jr.: background vocals 
Rudolph Isley: background vocals
Ernie Isley: six-string & twelve-string acoustic guitars, drums, background vocals 
Marvin Isley: bass guitar, background vocals 
Chris Jasper: electric piano, ARP synthesizer, background vocals 
Produced, written, arranged and composed by the Isley Brothers

References

1975 singles
1975 songs
The Isley Brothers songs
Whitney Houston songs
Songs written by Chris Jasper
Regina Belle songs
Soul ballads
T-Neck Records singles
1970s ballads
Songs written by Ernie Isley
Songs written by Marvin Isley
Songs written by Rudolph Isley
Songs written by O'Kelly Isley Jr.
Songs written by Ronald Isley